Cherry Town is a 1962 Soviet musical film directed by Herbert Rappaport. It is based on Dmitri Shostakovich's 1959 operetta Moscow, Cheryomushki.

Plot 
The film tells about a young architect who stubbornly seeks a new apartment in Cheryomushki and finally gets it. However, settling there, she observes how one of the walls collapses...

Cast

References

External links 
 

1962 films
1960s Russian-language films
1962 musical comedy films
Soviet musical comedy films
Operetta films